The European Union Mission in Armenia (EUMA) is a European Union Common Security and Defence Policy civilian deployment on the territory of the Republic of Armenia.

History
The mission was announced on 23 January 2023 to build upon the work of two previous EU deployments in Armenia, the European Union Monitoring Capacity to Armenia and the EU Planning Assistance Team in Armenia following the Armenia–Azerbaijan border crisis. The mission was formally launched on 20 February 2023.

Mandate
The objective of the mission is to contribute to stability in the border areas of Armenia, build confidence on the ground, conduct active patrolling and reporting, and to support normalization efforts between Armenia and Azerbaijan led by the President of the European Council, Charles Michel. EUMA will have an initial mandate of 2 years and its operational headquarters will be based within Armenia. It is expected that around 100 EU personnel will be deployed. EUMA will conduct border patrols along the entire length of Armenia's border with Azerbaijan, including along the Nakhchivan exclave.

Contributing states
Since launch, the following countries have contributed personnel:

Timeline of events
On 27 December 2022, Armenian Foreign Minister, Ararat Mirzoyan wrote to the EU's High Representative of the Union for Foreign Affairs and Security Policy and invited the European Union to deploy a civilian CSDP mission in the country. The mission was subsequently approved by the Council of the European Union on 23 January 2023 with an initial period of deployment of two years.

On 23 January 2023, Prime Minister of Armenia Nikol Pashinyan met with EU Special Representative for the South Caucasus, Toivo Klaar and the EU Ambassador to Armenia Andrea Wiktorin to discuss the deployment of EUMA, expanding Armenia–EU cooperation, and issues concerning the blockade of Artsakh.

On 27 January 2023, the first high-level Armenia-EU Political and Security Dialogue meeting took place in Yerevan. Deputy Foreign Minister of Armenia Vahe Gevorgyan and Deputy Secretary General of the European External Action Service Enrique Mora discussed increasing political ties and further developing Armenia–European Union relations. The parties discussed issues facing Armenia and security challenges across Europe, the deployment of EUMA, the need to establish a stable and peaceful South Caucasus region, and the process of normalization of Armenia–Turkey relations. Enrique Mora stated, "The first ever Armenia-EU Political and Security Dialogue launched today demonstrates our mutual interest in enhancing cooperation on foreign and security policy issues, and readiness to work together for the benefit of peace, security and stability."

On 30 January 2023, Markus Ritter, an officer of the German Federal Police and former Head of the European Union Advisory Mission in Iraq, was named as the Head of Mission of EUMA. It was also announced that the headquarters of the mission will be in Yeghegnadzor.

On 9 February 2023, French MEP Nathalie Loiseau confirmed that members of the French National Gendarmerie will be among those deployed to Armenia as part of the EU mission. Loiseau stated, "the mission will start on February 20, and I will be in Armenia on that day. I welcome Armenia's support and cooperation with the mission. The mission will be our eyes and ears on the ground, and its presence should deter new attacks."

On 17 March 2023, during a meeting of the Standing Committee on European Integration, Armenian deputy foreign minister Paruyr Hovhannisyan stated that relations between Armenia and EU member states have been increasing over the past year and are more dynamic. The minister applauded the efforts of the EU Mission and stated that the EU has significantly contributed to the security and stabilization of the region.

Reactions

Positive
 Armenia: Armenian Foreign Minister, Ararat Mirzoyan stated, "We very much welcome the EU's decision to send a fully-fledged civilian mission to Armenia. We will readily cooperate with the mission and support its activities."

 European Union: Josep Borrell, the European Union High Representative for Foreign Affairs and Security Policy stated, "The establishment of an EU Mission in Armenia launches a new phase in the EU's engagement in the South Caucasus. The EU will continue to support de-escalation efforts and is committed to work closely with both sides towards the ultimate goal of sustainable peace in the region."

 France: French Foreign Minister, Catherine Colonna stated that France would be happy to participate in the new mission.

 Germany: German Foreign Minister Annalena Baerbock stated that the EU mission will help ensure stability and trust in the region and said that Germany would cooperate with local experts to ensure peace and security in the area.

 Iran: The ambassador of Iran to Armenia confirmed that Iran does not oppose the activities of the EU mission along the Armenia–Azerbaijan border.

 Luxembourg: Foreign Minister of Luxembourg Jean Asselborn reaffirmed Luxembourg's support to the EU mission and the OSCE Minsk Group's efforts towards a peaceful resolution of the Nagorno-Karabakh conflict.

 NATO: On 18 January 2023, the NATO Secretary General's Special Representative for the Caucasus and Central Asia, Javier Colomina Píriz, met with Foreign Minister of Armenia Ararat Mirzoyan. The sides discussed increasing Armenia–NATO cooperation and other regional issues. Special Representative Píriz expressed support for the EU Mission in Armenia.

 The Netherlands: The government of The Netherlands expressed support for the activities of the EU mission in Armenia and will explore options to facilitate the mission.

 United States: On 3 March 2023, the United States ambassador to Armenia Kristina Kvien met with the Head of the European Union Mission in Armenia, Markus Ritter. Ambassador Kvien confirmed that the United States strongly supports the EU Mission in Armenia.

Negative
 Azerbaijan: On 24 January 2023, the Foreign Ministry of Azerbaijan issued a statement criticizing the mission and adding that it believed that the previous mission agreed at the European Political Community summit in Prague in October 2022 was biased in favour of Armenia.
 Russia: Russian Foreign Minister Sergey Lavrov dismissed the EU mission as "counterproductive", arguing that it "could create additional tensions". Lavrov also said that the CSTO was prepared to send a monitoring mission to Armenia, but that the Armenian authorities had opted to cooperate with the EU instead. On 9 February 2023, Russian ambassador to Azerbaijan stated, "the actions of the European Union are aimed at ousting Russia from the process of normalization of Azerbaijani-Armenian relations" and " in this matter, the European Union looks like a direct appendage of the United States and NATO, which consider the CIS space as a zone of opposition to Russia and are actually trying to bring a geopolitical component here."

See also
 Armenia–European Union relations
 EU Strategy for the South Caucasus
 Foreign relations of Armenia
 Foreign relations of the European Union
 Nagorno-Karabakh conflict

References

External links
 European Union Mission in Armenia official website
 European Union Mission in Armenia on Twitter
 European Union Mission in Armenia announcement on European Council

Military and civilian missions of the European Union
Nagorno-Karabakh conflict
Armenia–European Union relations
Armenia–Azerbaijan relations
Politics of the European Union
January 2023 events in Europe
2020s in Armenia